The Park City Formation is a geologic formation in Montana and Utah. It preserves fossils dating back to the Permian period.

See also

 List of fossiliferous stratigraphic units in Montana
 Paleontology in Montana

References
 

Permian geology of Montana
Permian Idaho
Permian geology of Utah